The Telephone is a 1910 American silent black and white drama film produced by Vitagraph Company of America.

Cast
 Leo Delaney as The Husband
 Rose Tapley as The Wife
 Dolores Costello as The Child

References

External links
 
 

American silent short films
American black-and-white films
Silent American drama films
1910 drama films
1910 films
Vitagraph Studios short films
General Film Company
1910s American films